A tree swing cartoon or tire swing cartoon is a humorous graphical metaphor that purports to explain communication pitfalls in the division of labor in the development of a product. It depicts how different departments implement or describe a tire swing attached to a tree, and how different it is from what the customer actually intended. It has also been used to illustrate the waterfall model of software development.

The origin of this cartoon appears to be from at least the late 60's, and possibly earlier. The original date and author are currently unknown, as is the exact original form. Many variants of it appeared later in several books on education, software engineering and management.

References

Individual printed cartoons
Metaphors
Production economics